Jeffrey Philip LaBar (March 18, 1963 – July 14, 2021) was an American guitarist in the glam metal band Cinderella, in which he replaced original guitarist Michael Schermick.

During Cinderella's temporary break-up in the mid-1990s, LaBar supported himself by running a pizza shop with his brother and by doing assorted construction jobs.

Career

Cinderella
LaBar was also in a side band with Cinderella bandmate Eric Brittingham called Naked Beggars. In April 2007, LaBar and his wife Debinique parted ways with Naked Beggars. Then Jeff recorded Freakshow in 2009 with Frankie Banali (Quiet Riot), and Tony Franklin (The Firm) along with singer/songwriter Markus Allen Christopher aka Ronnie Borchert (Miss Crazy). Jeff and Debinique also hosted an internet radio show "Late Night with the LaBar's" on Realityradio.biz.

In 2012, LaBar and Cinderella completed their 30th anniversary tour with fellow rock veterans Poison, who were also celebrating 30 years in the business. Jeff toured in support of his solo record with his son Sebastian and Jasmine Cain.

Personal life
LaBar was born in Darby, Pennsylvania, and grew up in Upper Darby Township, just outside Philadelphia. LaBar had part Japanese ancestry via his mother June. He was inspired by his brother Jack LaBar to pick up the guitar.

LaBar had a son named Sebastian from a previous marriage. Sebastian is the lead guitarist in two bands, Mach22 and Tantric.

Discography

Solo albums 
 One for the Road (2014)

With Cinderella 
 Night Songs (1986)
 Long Cold Winter (1988)
 Heartbreak Station (1990)
 Still Climbing (1994)

With Naked Beggars 
 Naked Beggars (2003)
 Spit It Out (2005)

With Freakshow 
 Freakshow (2009)

Death
LaBar died on July 14, 2021, at the age of 58, in Nashville, Tennessee. His wife Debinique Salazar discovered him unconscious in their Nashville apartment.

References

External links
Official website

1963 births
2021 deaths
20th-century American guitarists
American male guitarists
American musicians of Japanese descent
Cinderella (band) members
Glam metal musicians
Guitarists from Pennsylvania
People from Darby, Pennsylvania
People from Delaware County, Pennsylvania

fi:Jeff LaBar